Tsunimakhi (Dargwa: ЦIунимахьи) is a rural locality (a selo) in Urkhuchimakhinsky Selsoviet, Akushinsky District, Republic of Dagestan, Russia. The population was 481 as of 2010.

Geography 
Tsunimakhi is located 13 km northwest of Akusha (the district's administrative centre) by road, on the Inki River. Shumkhrimakhi is the nearest rural locality.

References 

Rural localities in Akushinsky District